Fernando García Valverde (born 26 April 1951), better known as Fernando Valverde or Tito Valverde, is a Spanish actor. Born in Ávila, he became very popular to a television audience for his performance as Pepe in the 1995 comedy television series Pepa y Pepe. He has later starred as Gerardo Castilla in the television series El comisario.

Selected filmography
Film

Television

References

External links 

1951 births
Living people
People from Ávila, Spain
Spanish male film actors
20th-century Spanish male actors
21st-century Spanish male actors
Male actors from Castile and León
Spanish male television actors